The MetroStar Award was presented for achievements in French-Canadian (Québécois) television and was based on popular vote. Many notable Québécois performing artists have been honored with this award; for example, Céline Dion in 1988 and Roy Dupuis in 1991, 1992, and 2003.

The sponsorship of this award (Metro Inc.) and its name were changed in 2006, when the Prix MetroStar became the Prix Artis (Artis Award).

See also

 Canadian television awards

External links
Informations générales: General information about the MetroStar Gala and the history of these awards, including the selection process.
New Gala, Same Public: Article in French published in Le Devoir (1 May 2006)
MetroStar Gala: 2005: Final year (Previous years are accessible from this site)

Canadian television awards